HR 4049, also known as HD 89353 and AG Antliae, is a binary post-asymptotic-giant-branch (post-AGB) star in the constellation Antlia.  A very metal-poor star, it is surrounded by a thick unique circumbinary disk enriched in several molecules.  With an apparent magnitude of about 5.5, the star can readily be seen under ideal conditions. It is located approximately  distant.

HR 4049 has a peculiar spectrum. The star appears, based on its spectrum in the Balmer series, to be a blue supergiant, although in reality it is an old low-mass star on the post-AGB phase of its life.  Its atmosphere is extremely deficient in heavy elements, over with a metallicity over 30,000 lower than the Sun.  It also shows a strong infrared excess, corresponding closely to a  blackbody produced by a disk of material surrounding the star.  The star is also undergoing intense mass-loss

HR 4049 has an unseen companion, detected from variations in the doppler shift of its spectral lines.  The properties of the companion can only be estimated by making certain assumptions about the inclination of the orbit and the mass function.  Given those assumptions, it is thought to be a low luminosity main sequence star.

HR 4049 is an unusual variable star, ranging between magnitudes 5.29 and 5.83 with a period of 429 days.  It has been given the variable star designation AG Antliae, but is still more commonly referred to as HR 4049.  It has been described as pulsating in a similar fashion to an RV Tauri variable, although the preferred interpretation is that the variations are produced by variable extinction produced by the material around the star and that the period is the same as the orbital period.

Although HR 4049 apparently has the spectrum of a blue supergiant, it is an old low-mass star which has exhausted nuclear fusion and is losing its outer layers as it transitions towards a white dwarf and possibly a planetary nebula.  During this phase it has a luminosity several thousand times that of the Sun, although a mass around half that of the sun.  The mass can only be guessed from the expected mass of the white dwarf that it is becoming.

References

External links
 The Spatial Distribution of Grains Around the Dual Chemistry Post-AGB Star
 Synthetic post-AGB evolution
 Non-linear radiative models of post-AGB stars: Application to HD 56126
 Post-AGB stars as testbeds of nucleosynthesis in AGB stars
 The post-AGB evolution of AGB mass loss variations

Antlia
Post-asymptotic-giant-branch stars
089353
J10180758-2859308
DENIS objects
Antliae, AG
4049
B-type supergiants
050456
Durchmusterung objects
Spectroscopic binaries